Diodotus III Plato (Platon "broad-shouldered") was a Greco-Bactrian king, also known simply by the regnal name Diodotus III, who for a short time ruled in southern Bactria during the mid 2nd century BCE. The style of Plato's coins suggests that he was a relative most likely a son of Eucratides the Great, whose rise to power is dated to around 170–165 BCE.

Some of Plato's coins have inscriptions which may possibly be interpreted as dates using the Indo-Greek era which started around 186 BCE. In that case Plato ruled around 140 BCE. This matches the dating given by numismatician Bopearachchi, who places Plato between 145–140 BCE, since his coins are not found in the ruins of Ai Khanoum, a Bactrian city which was destroyed during the reign of Eucratides.

See also 

 Greco-Bactrian Kingdom
 Seleucid Empire
 Greco-Buddhism
 Indo-Scythians
 Indo-Parthian Kingdom
 Kushan Empire

References 
 "The Shape of Ancient Thought. Comparative studies in Greek and Indian Philosophies" by Thomas McEvilley (Allworth Press and the School of Visual Arts, 2002) 
 "Buddhism in Central Asia" by B. N. Puri (Motilal Banarsidass Pub, January 1, 2000) 

Greco-Bactrian kings
2nd-century BC rulers in Asia
Year of birth unknown
160s BC deaths
Diodotid dynasty